Marguerite de Valois, la demoiselle de Belleville, also known as Marguerite, bâtarde de France (1407 – January 1458), was the illegitimate daughter of King Charles the Mad and his beloved mistress Odette de Champdivers. 

Marguerite was legitimated in January 1428 by Charles VII of France, her half-brother.  He gave her a very ample dowry and married her on 3 May 1428 in Poitou to Jean III de Harpedenne (also spelled Harpedanne, Harpedane, Harpedène, etc.), Seigneur of Belleville and Montaigu, son of Jean II de Harpedenne and his wife Jeanne de Mussidan. Some sources claim that she was married under the name of Marguerite de Falots.

Descendants
Claude de Belleville, the last known of their descendants, was killed in the Battle of Coutras on 20 October 1587 during the reign of Henry III of France. The poet Jacques Bereau wrote his epitaph. His father was Charles Harpedenne, lord of Belleville, Chantonnay, Sigournais, Puybelliard, Beaulieu, Saint-Flayve, La Roche-sur-Yon, etc., knight of the order of the King, and captain of 50 men in arms.

Notes

References

1407 births
1458 deaths
Valois, Marguerite de
House of Valois
Medieval French nobility
15th-century French people
15th-century French women
Daughters of kings